A swashbuckler is a rough, noisy and boastful adventurer.

Swashbuckler may also refer to:

Swashbuckler (film), a 1976 film
Swashbuckler (Dungeons & Dragons), a character class in the role-playing game
Swashbuckler (video game), published in 1982 by Datamost
Swashbuckler (board game), a 1980 game from Yaquinto
Swashbuckler films, a genre of film
Swashbuckler (comics), the nephew of Vigilante (Greg Saunders)
The former name of the Tampa Bay Buccaneers Cheerleaders
Louisiana Swashbucklers, an indoor football team

Swashbuckle may also refer to:

Swashbuckle (band), a pirate-themed American thrash-metal band
Swashbuckle (TV series), a British children's television show on the Cbeebies channel